Hinkender Bote ("limping messenger", French Messager boiteux, Italian Corrier zoppo)
was the title of several early modern almanacs which appeared in Switzerland, from the later 17th century and throughout the 18th century and in some cases to the present day. Since  1801, the Lahrer Hinkender Bote has also been published in Lahr, Baden-Württemberg, Germany.

The first publication with this title appeared in Basel in 1676. A French edition of the Basel publication appeared in Vevey in 1707.
A Bernese Hinkender Bote first appeared from 1695, from 1748 also in a French edition, Véritable Messager boiteux de Berne. This French edition was in turn published in a German translation in Vevey, as Hinkender Bott von Vivis, from 1794 to 1848.
Both the Bernese and the Vevey publication persist today. A Véritable Messager boiteux de Neuchâtel appeared 1805–1962. 
In Lugano, there was a Corrier zoppo, o sia Mercurio storico e politico from 1756 to 1762.

The almanachs contained calendars with both Catholic and Protestant feast days, the dates of important fairs and astronomical ephemerides, and anecdotal accounts of events of the preceding years sections accompanied with illustrations.
In Vevey, a tradition developed of depicting a real-life leg amputee on the cover; the currently serving "limping messenger" is one Jean-Luc Sansonnens of Fribourg (b. 1969) who lost his leg in a motorcycle accident in 1988. His predecessor was local celebrity Samuel Burnand (1896-1985).

References 
 

 Teresa Eva Tschu, Die Bilderwelt des «Berner Hinkenden Boten» Von seinen Anfängen bis zur Blütezeit am Ausgang des 18. Jahrhunderts
 François de Capitani,  (2009)

External links 
 Le Messager Boiteux (vevey.ch)

Defunct magazines published in Switzerland
Almanacs